Donald Sutherland (born 28 November 1949) is an Australian cricketer. He played in eleven first-class matches for South Australia between 1969 and 1972.

See also
 List of South Australian representative cricketers

References

External links
 

1949 births
Living people
Australian cricketers
South Australia cricketers
Cricketers from Adelaide